Hugh II (born c. 910-915 - died 967), called Carus (Latin for the Kind), was the second Lord of Lusignan, the son and successor of Hugh I Venator. According to the Chronicle of Saint-Maixent, he built the castle at Lusignan.  Hugh III Albus, who emerges from historical obscurity in the next generation, was probably his son.

Sources
Painter, Sidney. "The Lords of Lusignan in the Eleventh and Twelfth Centuries." Speculum, Vol. 32, No. 1 (Jan., 1957), pp 27–47.

House of Lusignan
10th-century French nobility
910s births
967 deaths
Year of birth uncertain